Uripok (Meitei pronunciation:/ū-rī-pōk/) is a census town in Imphal West district in the Indian state of Manipur.

Cult of Laikhurembi 
In Uripok, there is a temple of Goddess Laikhurembi. A carnival like atmosphere subdues the sacred traditional ritualistic ceremonies during the festival of Lai Haraoba. Among the noisy possession of the festive events, the maibis (priestesses) dance in the gentle melodies produced by pena. When the music stopped, the maibis became possessed by the spirits. Then, they delivered oracles. The audiences listen very attentively to their words.

References

External links
 Uripok-will-become-a-model-solar-electrified-assembly-constituency-joykumar.

Cities and towns in Imphal West district